Liu Jifu (born July 1949) is a retired Chinese politician who spent his entire career in his home-province Jiangxi. He was investigated by China's top anti-graft agency in October 2021, the 11th year of his retirement. Previously he served as director of Jiangxi Provincial Land and Resources Department, and before that, as party secretary, the top political position in three cities, Jiujiang, Ji'an, and Jiujiang. He was a delegate to the 11th National People's Congress.

Biography
Liu was born in Ji'an County, Jiangxi, in July 1949. In February 1968, he enlisted in the People's Liberation Army, serving until September 1978. He joined the Chinese Communist Party in December 1969.

Beginning in September 1978, he served in several posts in Ji'an Intermediate People's Court, including deputy director of office and deputy president. He served as deputy party secretary and mayor of Jinggangshan, a county-level city under the jurisdiction of Ji'an, in September 1987, and two years later promoted to the party secretary position. It would be his first job as "first-in-charge" of a city. He was promoted to party secretary of Ji'an in August 1991 and was admitted to member of the standing committee of the CPC Ji'an Municipal Committee, the city's top authority. 

In May 1995, he was transferred to the neighboring Yichun city and appointed deputy secretary.

In February 1998, he became deputy party secretary and mayor of Jiujiang, rising to party secretary in December 2001, and concurrently serving as chairman of Jiujiang People's Congress.

In June 2005, he was appointed party branch secretary of Jiangxi Provincial Land and Resources Department, concurrently holding the director position since March 2006. He retired in January 2010.

Downfall
On 13 October 2021, he was put under investigation for alleged "serious violations of discipline and laws" by the Central Commission for Discipline Inspection (CCDI), the party's internal disciplinary body, and the National Supervisory Commission, the highest anti-corruption agency of China. His successor Zhao Zhiyong was dismissed in June 2014 and demoted seven administrative levels from sub-provincial level down to Keyuan (section member). Chen Anzhong, a following party secretary of Jiujiang, was dismissed, arrested and investigated in December 2008 and sentenced 12 years in prison in June 20115.

References

1949 births
Living people
People from Ji'an
Central Party School of the Chinese Communist Party alumni
People's Republic of China politicians from Jiangxi
Chinese Communist Party politicians from Jiangxi
Delegates to the 11th National People's Congress